Clifton Hunter High School (CHHS) is a senior high school in Frank Sound, North Side, Grand Cayman, Cayman Islands.

It first opened in 2010.

History
In Fall 2010, middle school and high school education were merged at the public school level in the Cayman Islands, meaning that children from Years 7-11 would consequently all attend school together (previously, children in Years 7-9 would attend the George Hicks High School before graduating to the John Gray High School). The old George Hicks High School was absorbed by John Gray and the newly formed Clifton Hunter High School. The schools were then divided up by catchment area; children on the Eastern side of the island (up to Newlands) would attend Clifton Hunter High School (Years 7-11), and children living from Prospect up to West Bay were moved to the John Gray High School (which now encompassed Years 7 through Year 11). Clifton Hunter High School was situated on the former George Hicks campus. 
In 2012, Clifton Hunter moved to a newly built campus on in the district of North Side, while John Gray High moved to the former George Hicks campus in George Town, and the old John Gray campus was made into the Cayman Islands Further Education Centre (CIFEC).

References

External links
 Clifton Hunter High School

Schools in Grand Cayman
Secondary schools in the Cayman Islands
Educational institutions established in 2012
2012 establishments in British Overseas Territories